Gare de Montreuil-Bellay is a railway station serving the village of Montreuil-Bellay, Maine-et-Loire, western France. It is situated on the Saumur-Thouars railway, an electrified branch line of approximately 10 miles in length.  To the north of the line Saumur station also lies on the Tours–Saint-Nazaire railway.  TGV services to Paris are available from Tours. Thouars station to the south is situated on the Loudun-La Roche-Sur-Yon railway.

The station is served by regional trains (TER Pays de la Loire) towards Thouars, Saumur, Tours and La Roche-sur-Yon.

References

Railway stations in Maine-et-Loire
TER Pays de la Loire
TER Centre-Val de Loire